Wise County is a county located in the U.S. state of Virginia. The county was formed in 1856 from Lee, Scott, and Russell Counties and named for Henry A. Wise, who was the Governor of Virginia at the time.

History
The Cherokee conquered the area including Wise from the Xualae between 1671 and 1685. It was later contested by the Six Nations and the Shawnee. Cherokee and Shawnee hunting parties fought a protracted battle at the headwaters of the Clinch River for two days in the summer of 1786, a victory for the Cherokee although losses were heavy on both sides.

The first white explorers to reach present-day Wise county are said to have been Thomas Walker and Christopher Gist, both in 1750. Several forts were built all along the Clinch from 1774 onward, but only after Chickamauga Cherokee leader Bob Benge was slain in 1794 was present-day Wise considered safe for white settlers even to hunt in. One of the earliest settlers within the county was William Wells around 1792.

In the 1880s, coal deposits became the dominant resource utilized in the area. The Stonega Coke and Coal Company (SC&C) was formed in the town of Appalachia, Virginia. Immigration trends and economic conditions across the country attracted many people to the area for work, including African Americans and Irish, Polish, Italian, and Hungarian immigrants.

Virginia's two highest security state prisons are located in Wise County: Red Onion State Prison, opened in 1998, and Wallens Ridge State Prison, opened in 1999.

In July 2012 Dominion Energy built Virginia City Hybrid Energy Center in Wise County, a hybrid power plant that burns 80% coal and up to 20% biomass. In 2014, the plant was fined $47,651 by the Virginia Department of Environmental Quality for emitting carbon monoxide and other gases at levels exceeding state regulations.

Geography

The county is part of the Appalachians and has many  mountainous features, including the peak of High Knob and Powell Valley.

Adjacent counties and cities

Major highways
  U.S. Route 23
  U.S. Route 58 Alternate
  State Route 63
  State Route 72
  State Route 83

National protected area
 Jefferson National Forest (part)

Demographics

2020 census

Note: the US Census treats Hispanic/Latino as an ethnic category. This table excludes Latinos from the racial categories and assigns them to a separate category. Hispanics/Latinos can be of any race.

2000 Census
As of the census of 2010, there were 41,452 people, 15,968 households, and 10,892 families residing in the county.  The population density was 102.8 people per square mile (38/km2).  There were 17,940 housing units at an average density of 44 per square mile (17/km2).  The racial makeup of the county was 93% White, 5.2% Black or African American, 0.10% Native American, 0.30% Asian, 0.01% Pacific Islander, and 0.90% from two or more races.  1.10% of the population were Hispanic or Latino of any race.

There were 15,968 households, out of which 31.80% had children under the age of 18 living with them, 50,30% were married couples living together, 12.60% had a female householder with no husband present, and 31.80% were non-families. 27.40% of all households were made up of individuals, and 11.40% had someone living alone who was 65 years of age or older.  The average household size was 2.40 and the average family size was 2.90.

In the county, the population was spread out, with 20.80% under the age of 18 and 14.10% who were 65 years of age or older.  The median age was 39 years. For every 100 females there were 107 males.  For every 100 females age 18 and over, there were 107.08 males.

The median income for a household in the county was $35,053. The per capita income for the county was $17,512.  About 19.30% of the population were below the poverty line.  The homeownership rate for the county is 70.00%

Education

Public schools
Wise County Public Schools operates thirteen school facilities in the county for its students. For several years the Wise County School Board has considered consolidating high schools, and in 2011 it consolidated six high schools into three; Union High which serves the western part of the county, Central High which serves the central and northern parts of the county, and Eastside High which serves the eastern part of the county.

Private schools
Wise County Christian School operates as a private school in the county.

Colleges and universities
 University of Virginia's College at Wise, Wise
 Mountain Empire Community College, Big Stone Gap

Media

Newspapers
 The Clinch Valley Times is a weekly newspaper serving Castlewood and St. Paul, Virginia, and the surrounding areas.
 The Coalfield Progress   is a twice-weekly newspaper covering news through the county.

Radio stations
 WAXM
 WDXC
 WGCK-FM
 WISE-FM (simulcast of WVTF)
 WLSD
 WNVA (AM)
 WQSN

Tourist attractions

Natural and outdoor recreation

A large portion of the Jefferson National Forest is contained within Wise County, and the Clinch River winds through the county.  These two factors, combined with Wise County's location in the Appalachian Mountains, mean that Wise County offers many opportunities for outdoor recreation.

In addition to many trails connecting to and surrounding the Appalachian Trail system, Wise county is home to many parks, including Miners' Park in Big Stone Gap and the Louis E. Henegar Miners' Memorial Park in Appalachia.

Among the unique features of Wise County are High Knob, a mountain which featured one of the last remaining Appalachian Fire Towers until its destruction by arson on October 31, 2007, and Wetlands Estonoa, an Appalachian Wetland and part of the Clinch River Watershed.

Theater and the arts
 The Trail of the Lonesome Pine Outdoor Drama is performed in Big Stone Gap, Virginia throughout the summer.  It is the Commonwealth of Virginia's official outdoor drama.
 The Pro-Art Association offers a variety of theatrical, musical, and fine-arts events throughout the school year.  It is headquartered in Wise.
 The Wise County Summer Academy of Art, sponsored by Wise County Public Schools and funded in part by the Virginia Commission of Arts, provides fine arts programming for children throughout the summer months, including large scale productions and touring performance opportunities.
 The Appalachian Children's Theater (ACT) promotes performing arts and fine arts education for children in Southwest Virginia, Eastern Kentucky, and Northeast Tennessee.  In 2006, the organization opened its newly renovated facility in Downtown Wise. 
 The Charles W. Harris Art Gallery is located on the site of the Wise County Public Library in Wise.

Festivals and fairs
 "Clinch River Days" is a festival to celebrate mountain heritage and takes place in St. Paul each spring.
 Best Friend Festival held in Norton, VA annually.
 The Virginia-Kentucky District Fair is held each summer in Wise.
 The Wise County Famous Fall Fling is an annual event held in Downtown Wise. 
 Coeburn holds its annual Guest River Rally over the Labor Day weekend in September.
 Appalachia Coal Railroad Days is held each summer in Appalachia.
 Pound Heritage Days is held annually the week before Labor Day in Pound.
 Dock Boggs Oldtime Music Festival held the second weekend in September at the Country Cabin in Norton, Virginia.
 Mountain Craft Days held the third weekend of October on the campus of Mountain Empire Community College in Big Stone Gap, Virginia.
 The RTE 23 Music Festival is held at the end of August ever year on the campus of the University of Virginia's College at Wise.

Historical
 National Register of Historic Places listings in Wise County, Virginia
 Southwest Virginia Museum Historical State Park
 Wise County Courthouse
 High Knob Lookout Tower
 Colonial Hotel
 E. M. Fulton House
 Derby Historic District

Sports
 Lonesome Pine Raceway

UVa-Wise hosts NCAA Division II Baseball, Basketball, Football, Lacrosse, Softball, and other inter-collegiate games on the campus of UVa-Wise.

Communities
 The independent city of Norton lies within the confines of Wise County, but is not a part of the county.

Towns

 Appalachia
 Big Stone Gap
 Coeburn
 Pound
 St. Paul
 Wise

Census-designated places

 Big Stone Gap East
 Dunbar
 East Stone Gap
 Osaka
 Riverview
 Stonega
 Tacoma
 University of Virginia's College at Wise

Notable residents
 Rufus A. Ayers – Lawyer, businessman, and Attorney General of Virginia 1886–1890
 Carroll Dale – Football player for the Los Angeles Rams and Green Bay Packers
 John Fox Jr. – Journalist, novelist, and short story writer
 Napoleon Hill – American self-help author
 A. Linwood Holton – Virginia political figure and attorney. He served as the 61st Governor of Virginia, from 1970 to 1974.
 Julius Jones –  American football running back in the National Football League for the Dallas Cowboys, Seattle Seahawks, and New Orleans Saints
 Thomas Jones – Actor and former American football running back who played twelve seasons in the National Football League
 Holly Kiser – First Make Me a Supermodel winner
 Edith Maxwell – Schoolteacher convicted of murdering her father, triggering a nationwide media sensation
 Glen Roberts – American National Basketball League player; one of the first players to put the "jump shot" to practical use
 George C. Scott – Stage and film actor, director and producer. He was best known for his stage work, as well as his portrayal of General George S. Patton in the film Patton.
 Ralph Stanley –  Bluegrass artist, known for his distinctive singing and banjo playing. Stanley began playing music in 1946 and was inducted into both the International Bluegrass Music Hall of Honor and the Grand Ole Opry.
 Adriana Trigiani – Author of sixteen books, television writer, film director, and entrepreneur.

Politics

References

External links

 Wise County, Virginia's Official Website
 Interactive Geographic Information System

 
Virginia counties
1856 establishments in Virginia
Counties of Appalachia